The Baby Dalupan Philippine Basketball Association (PBA) Coach of the Year is an annual Philippine Basketball Association (PBA) award given since the 1993 PBA season. The winner receives the Baby Dalupan Trophy, which is named since 1995 in honor of Dalupan, who won 15 championships in the PBA and led the Crispa Redmanizers to win its first Grand Slam in 1976. Unlike the traditional player awards, which is given by the league, this citation is awarded by the PBA Press Corps.

Since its inception, the award has been given to 13 different coaches. The most recent award winner of Baby Dalupan Trophy is TNT Tropang Giga head coach Chot Reyes.

List of awardees

Multiple time winners

Notes

References

Philippine Basketball Association awards
Awards established in 1993
1993 establishments in the Philippines